Stenodus is a genus of large-sized whitefish in the family Salmonidae. It consists of two species; one of them (beloribitsa) is extinct in wild. The two species have alternatively been considered subspecies of the single species Stenodus leucichthys.

Species
 Stenodus leucichthys — beloribitsa: the Caspian Sea basin
 Stenodus nelma — nelma, sheefish or inconnu: rivers of the Arctic basin.

Systematics

The genus Stenodus is distinctive from other whitefishes due to its size and specialized predator morphology; however, evidence of independence from the broader freshwater whitefish genus Coregonus is not clearly evident.

References

Sources 
 

 
Ray-finned fish genera
Taxa named by John Richardson (naturalist)